Ozark is an unincorporated community in Johnson County, Illinois, United States. Ozark is south of New Burnside. and has a post office with ZIP code 62972. Ozark is also home to Camp Ondessonk, a Catholic youth camp that is run by the Belleville Diocese.

Notable person
 Carl Choisser (1895-1939), Illinois state representative, lawyer, and newspaper editor, was born in Ozark.

References

Unincorporated communities in Johnson County, Illinois
Unincorporated communities in Illinois